Trichocoronis is a genus of North American aquatic plants in the tribe Eupatorieae within the family Asteraceae. Bugheal is a common name for plants in this genus.

Trichocoronis  is thought to be related to two other aquatic genera in the same tribe: Sclerolepis and Shinnersia. They are annuals or perennials.

 Species
 Trichocoronis sessilifolia (S.Schauer) B.L.Rob. - Michoacán, Oaxaca, Jalisco, D.F., México State
 Trichocoronis wrightii (Torr. & A.Gray) A.Gray - Texas, California, Baja California Sur, Sonora, Tamaulipas, San Luis Potosí
 formerly included
 Trichocoronis rivularis A.Gray - Shinnersia rivularis (A.Gray) R.M.King & H.Rob.

References 

Eupatorieae
Asteraceae genera
Flora of Mexico
Flora of California
Aquatic plants
Taxa named by Asa Gray
Taxa named by John Torrey